Justice Vivian Bose (also rendered V. V. N. Bose) (9 June 1891 – 29 November 1983), Judge of the Supreme Court of India, served as the National Commissioner of the Bharat Scouts and Guides from November 1957 to November 1959.

Scouting for native Indians was started by Justice Bose, Pandit Madan Mohan Malaviya, Pandit Hridayanath Kunzru, Annie Besant and George Arundale, in 1913.

Justice Bose was a member of the World Scout Committee of the World Organization of the Scout Movement from 1947 until 1949.

He was also the President of the International Commission of Jurists. Justice Bose is known for breaking new ground in law, the significance of which came to be realized in later years.

The landmark judgement by Vivian Bose J in Virsa Singh v State of Punjab [1958 AIR 465] has set an important judicial precedent regarding the applicability of section 300 Thirdly of The Indian Penal Code of 1860.

He was married to Canadian Irene Mott, the author of The Monkey Tree on 18 December 1930.

References

External links
 Bharat Scouts & Guides
 Cambridge Journals Online – Abstract

1891 births
1983 deaths
Justices of the Supreme Court of India
Scouting pioneers
Scouting and Guiding in India
World Scout Committee members
20th-century Indian judges